The Myanmar Maternal and Child Welfare Association (abbreviated MMCWA) is a non-governmental organisation in Burma which aims to protects mothers and their children in the country.

Although it dates back to 1948, it was supported by the Burmese government when it was established in its new centre in April 1991 particularly because the organisation aimed to cover much of the country in protection. As of 2008 the MMCWA now functions with 324 township associations, and 11,233 branch associations formed to undertake health and welfare activities nationwide. It now has over 2,000,000 volunteer workers serving the organisation throughout Burma.

The headquarters are at the corner of Thanthuma Road and Parami Road in South Okkalapa Township, Yangon.

History
After Burma gained independence, maternal and child welfare associations were set up in towns and cities. But those association lacked a central organisation and existed only as local entities. From the time independence was gained to 1964, up to 120 maternal and child welfare associations were formed. The Myanmar Maternal and Child Welfare Association (Centre) was formed on 30 April 1991 and has subsidiary bodies such as the Centre, State/Division, District Supervisory Committees, Township Associations and Branch Associations.

Aim
The aim of the association is to contribute to the emergence of a peaceful modern developed nation by improving the health, education, social affairs and economic affairs of  families including mother and children, with the priority towards the rural population.

Activities
Currently the Myanmar Maternal and Child Welfare Association is carrying out the following activities:
 Health activities
 Education activities
 Economic activities
 Social activities
 Cooperation with local and foreign organisation
 Planning annual programmes for future activities

References

http://www.mmcwa-myanmar.org/

External links
 The Myanmar Maternal and Child Welfare Association Official Website

Medical and health organisations based in Myanmar
1948 establishments in Burma